Prurigo is an itchy eruption of the skin.

Specific types include:
 Prurigo nodularis
 Actinic prurigo
 Besnier's prurigo (a specific type of atopic dermatitis).

References

External links 

Pruritic skin conditions